The women's 100 metre butterfly event at the 2014 Asian Games took place on 23 September 2014 at Munhak Park Tae-hwan Aquatics Center.

Schedule
All times are Korea Standard Time (UTC+09:00)

Records

Results 
Legend
DNS — Did not start

Heats

Final

References
Heats Results
Final Results

External links
Official website

Swimming at the 2014 Asian Games